Fish Pool is an international commodity exchange located in Bergen, Norway that trades salmon futures contracts. The exchange is 97% owned by the stock exchange in Norway Oslo Børs. Trading at Fish Pool commenced in May 2006. The volumes traded at the exchange represent approximately 10-15% of the annual production of farmed Atlantic salmon in Norway.

The primary objective of the exchange is to facilitate risk management of salmon spot price risk. Salmon farmers (sellers of farmed salmon) and processors (buyers of salmon) are examples of entities that use futures contracts for risk management of salmon spot price risk.

Fish Pool Index
The Fish Pool Index is the corresponding index that is issued each week on the price of salmon. The index is a synthetic market price for fresh atlantic salmon and quoted in NOK per kilogram.

References
Fish Pool prices, fantasy or reality?

90,000 tonnes of salmon traded at Fish Pool

Academic studies on Fish Pool derivatives
The spot-futures prices relationship on Fish Pool

Hedging efficiency of Fish Pool futures contracts

Is there a risk premium on Fish Pool futures contracts?

Commodity exchanges
Stock exchanges in Norway
Financial services companies of Norway
Financial services companies established in 2006
2006 establishments in Norway